

History 

Castles are defensive constructions for a noble, artistocratic, or other important person and their family. They consist of strong walls (beginning with wood in earlier times and then being made out of stone) with tall towers. Depending on their size, they may include an interior yard which can include other buildings for horses, blacksmiths, food stores, etc.

The first fortified constructions in the Albanian lands were erected during the late Neolithic in the years 2800-2700 BC.
In the bronze period, but especially in the early period of iron, they became widespread. Some Illyrian forts are known as Rozafa in Shkodra, Berat Castle, Lis, Byllis, Amantia, Butrint, Antigonia, etc.
Then, in the 4th-6th century of the New Era were raised castles in the low and strategic areas such as the Castle of Durres, the Castle of Gjirokastra, the Castle of Elbasan and later the Kruja Castle.
Even in the Middle Ages to the 19th century were built and rebuilt many fortresses that they already find in many areas of Albanian lands. These castles are a great asset to the Albanian nation.
They point to its antiquity in the Balkans, to the art of building and its centuries-old centeredness against its threatened enemies. The castles have great cultural and tourist value.

Berat Castle (Antipatrea) 

Ancient castle in Berat raised on the rocky hill of the city, in 185-187 meters altitude, on the side of Osum River. It was a proto-urban settlement of the 7th-5th century BC. It belonged to the Illyrian tribe of Desarte. As an important point it turned into a high-rise city with an area of about 10 hectares. It mentions (216 BC) with the ancient name Antipatrea, when it was taken away by Skardilajdi during the Macedonian-Roman fighting. The Byzantine Emperor Theodore II (408-450) strengthened and named Pulheriopolis. From the Romans it was also called the name Albanorum oppidum (Fortress of the Arberites). In the thirteenth century was the center of Muzakaj's principality. It was captured by the Ottomans in 1417. It was taken over by Ali Pasha Tepelena in 1809, which strengthened the walls. For its greatness and its facilities, it attracts many visitors.

Castle of Durres 

Castle of Durres is a castle of the early medieval southwest of the peninsula of Durres. It was built in the 5th-6th century. During the period of Emperor Anastasia I of Byzantium who was from Illyria and who was born in this city. The surrounding walls lay at 3.5 km and had 4 towers of about 18 meters high. Around 500 meters of surrounding walls are kept. At its entrance there was a bronze statue of a cavalry (according to historian Anna Komneni's description). In the years 1274-1280, the Anzhuins rebuilt the acropolis and raised the height of the towers. Karl and Gjergj Topia in the 14th century here had their headquarters. The fortress was captured by the Ottomans in 1501, who after a year, built a separating wall, greatly reducing it and turning it into a fortress castle.

The castle of Shkodra (Rozafa) 

The castle of Shkodra by locals is called Rozafa. It rises above a rocky hill to the west of the city, between Drin and Buna rivers. Its walls surround 9 hectares of land. The main entrance is from the northeast. It is known as a fortified center since the Illyrian King Gent. Historian Tit Livi calls it "the strongest labeat site". As Rozafa emerges from the 6th century. According to the legend, Rozafa was the younger brother's bride. He was one of the three brothers who raised this castle on its walls. Based on the legend is keeping the word given and flirting for the sake of the future. The castle was a symbol of resistance. In different historical periods there were also under Byzantines, Slavs and then under Ottoman invaders. In the 14th century, it was owned by Balshaj, while the Bushat family there raised its palace. In general, Rozafa is well preserved and attracts tourists and visitors.

 
Military history of Albania